Puertollano Fútbol Sala was a futsal club based in Puertollano, city of the autonomous community of Castile-La Mancha.

The club was founded in 1994 and played home games at Antonio Rivilla with capacity of 3,000 seaters.

In 2012–13 season, played in Primera División finishing in bottom place, being relegated to Segunda División. After unclear weeks about the club future, was disbanded due to unpaid debts and limited financial means.

Sponsors
Viproman - (1996–1999)
Restaurante Dacho - (2008–2010)

Season to season

2 seasons in Primera División
7 seasons in Segunda División
7 seasons in Segunda División B
3 seasons in Tercera División

Current squad 2012/13

References

External links
Official Website
Profile at LNFS.es
Old Profile at LNFS.es

1994 establishments in Castilla–La Mancha
2013 disestablishments in Castilla–La Mancha
Futsal clubs in Spain
Futsal clubs established in 1994
Sports clubs disestablished in 2013
Sports teams in Castilla–La Mancha
Puertollano